The term configuration item (CI) refers to the fundamental structural unit of a configuration management system. Examples of CIs include individual hardware or software components. The configuration-management system oversees the life of the CIs through a combination of processes and tools by implementing and enabling the fundamental elements of identification, change management, status accounting, and audits. This system aims to avoid the introduction of errors related to lack of testing as well as of incompatibilities with other CIs.

Description 
The term "configuration item" can be applied to a product, allocated component of a product, or both that satisfies an end use function, has distinct requirements, functionality and/or product relationships, and is designated for distinct control in the configuration-management system. Configuration items and their associated product configuration information versions, and approved changes, form the basis of any current approved configuration audit. 

 The entity must be uniquely identified so that it can be distinguished from all other configuration items and their associated product configuration information. 
 From the perspective of the implementer of a change, the CI is "what items" within the product structure is effected by the change. Altering a specific baseline version of a configuration item creates a new version of the baseline containing the revise changes to the information impacted by the change. The CI part number may change based on if the new or updated part will no longer be Interchangeable functionally or physically with the existing part. The software CI version will changes for any time a change is implemented. In examining the effect of a change, two of the questions that must be asked are:
 What configuration items are affected? 
 How have the configuration items and their associated configuration information and interfaces are affected?
 The use of the CI within a product can be traced in a robust status-accounting system. 
 The CI is subject to acceptance verification based on established criteria.

Configuration item types 
Examples of CI types are:
 Hardware/devices
 Software/applications
 Communications/networks
 System
 Location
 Facility
 Database
 Service

Entities of change management, incidents and problem management and other processes are sometimes also considered a configuration items.

CI attributes and data 
Configuration items are represented by their properties. These properties can be common to all the configuration items (e.g. unique item code that we will generate, description of function, end of the lifecycle or business owner that is approving configuration item changes and technical owner, i.e. administrator, that is supporting it and implementing the changes). Further properties can be specific for the given item type. Hardware devices will have some properties, database servers another and application and certificates again other properties.

Examples of common properties:

 CI unique identifier or identification code
 CI name or label (often, both long names and short names)
 CI abbreviations or acronyms
 CI description
 CI ownership (organizations and people)
 CI importance

Identifying properties
 Each type of configuration item should have certain properties, combination of which will be unique. Therefore, we will be able to recognize according to them which item we are dealing with. In case of devices such unique combination will be e.g. manufacturer of the device, model/type and serial number.

Identifying properties (highlighted in red) allow us to distinguish between particular instances of these items.

Releases 
A release (itself, a versioned entity) may consist of several configuration items. The set of changes to each configuration item will appear in the release notes, and the notes may contain specific headings for each configuration item. A complex hardware configuration item may have many levels of configuration items beneath its top level; each configuration item level must meet the same fundamental elements of the configuration management system.

A modern approach to managing configuration items relating to releases is to make use of code repositories and artifact repositories to supplement the configuration management database. This can be seen in the use of a definitive media library.

Vocabulary 
In addition to its purpose in the implementation and management of a change, each configuration item's listing and definition should act as a common vocabulary across all groups connected to the product. One should define the CI at a level such that an individual involved with product marketing and an individual responsible for implementation can agree to a common definition when they use the name of the configuration item. Selection and identification of configuration items for a particular project can be seen as the first step in developing an overall architecture of the product from the top down.

References

External links
 What is configuration management?
 Configuration item definition
 Physical configuration audit
 Functional configuration audit
 Functional configuration audit
  Configuration management training material
 Guide to CMDB solution design
Configuration management